David Sharpe (born 8 July 1967) is a former British middle-distance runner who won a silver medal at the European Championships in Split 1990 over 800 m. In 1988 he won the European Indoor Championships and in 1992 he came first in the 800 m race at the World Cup in Havana. In 1992 Sharpe won the B-race in Zurich in a personal best of 1:43.98 min.

International competitions

References

English male middle-distance runners
1967 births
Living people
European Athletics Championships medalists
World Athletics U20 Championships winners